The Aimaq or Chahar Aimaq, also transliterated as Aimagh, Aimak and Aymaq, are a collection of Sunni and mostly Persian-speaking nomadic and semi-nomadic tribes. They live mostly in the central and western highlands of Afghanistan, especially in Ghor and Badghis. Aimaqs were originally known as chahar ("four") Aymaqs: the Taymani (the main element in the population of Ghor), the Firozkohi (mostly in Badghis), the Jamshidi and the Timuri. Other sources state that the Aimaq Hazara are one of the Chahar, with the Timuri instead being of the "lesser Aimaqs" or Aimaq-e digar ("other Aimaqs").

The Aimaq speak several subdialects of the Aimaq dialect of the Persian language, but some southern groups of Taymani, Firozkohi, and northeastern Timuri Aimaqs have adopted the Pashto language.

Origin and culture 
The Aimaqs claim different origins based on their tribal background. Some claim to be descended from the troops of Genghis Khan. Other tribes such as the Taymani and Firozkohi claim descent from other Pashtun tribes.

Aimaq is a Mongolic word that means "tribe" or "grazing territory". Of all Aimaqs, Aimaq Hazara and Timuri are closest to the Turco-Mongol tradition since they are semi-nomadic tribes and some of them live in yurts, whereas other Aimaqs live in traditional Afghan black tents. The Aimaq are largely nomadic to semi-nomadic goat and sheep herders. They also trade with villages and farmers during migrations for pastures for their livestock. The material culture and foodstuffs of the Aimaq include skins, carpets, milk, dairy products and more. They trade these products to settled peoples in return for vegetables, grains, fruits, nuts, and other types of foods and goods.

Classification of tribes 
Aimaq tribes

Demographics 

Estimates of the Aimaq population vary between 250,000 and 500,000. They are largely Sunni Muslims except for the Jamshidi who are mainly Ismaili Shia in the main and in contrast to the Hazaras, who are mostly Shia Muslims.

See also 
 Aimaq Hazara
 Hazaras
 Qara'unas

Notes

References

Further reading 
 Macgregor, Central Asia, (Calcutta, 1871)

External links 
 Aimaq Man with Children, Pal-Kotal-I-Guk, Ghor Province
 Aimaq Nomad Camp Pal-Kotal-I-Guk Between Chakhcharan and Jam Afghanistan

Aymaq
Ethnic groups in Afghanistan
Modern nomads